'Aper-'Anati (also written Aper-Anat and Aperanat) was a ruler of Lower Egypt during the Second Intermediate Period in the mid-17th century BC. According to Jürgen von Beckerath he was the second king of the 16th Dynasty and a vassal of the Hyksos kings of the 15th Dynasty. This opinion was recently rejected by Kim Ryholt. In his 1997 study of the Second Intermediate Period, Ryholt argues that the kings of the 16th Dynasty ruled an independent Theban realm c. 1650–1580 BC. Consequently, Ryholt sees 'Aper-'Anati as an early Hyksos king of the 15th Dynasty, perhaps its second ruler. This analysis has convinced some Egyptologists, such as Darrell Baker and Janine Bourriau, but not others including Stephen Quirke.

'Aper-'Anati is only known from a single scarab-seal, now in the Petrie Museum. On the scarab he is given the title of Heka-chasut, which translates as "Ruler of the Foreign Lands" and from which the word Hyksos is derived. Significantly, this title was borne by the early Hyksos kings of the 15th Dynasty. Based on this evidence, Ryholt tentatively proposes that 'Aper-'Anati was the second ruler of the 15th Dynasty, but points out that this identification is not certain.

References 

17th-century BC Pharaohs
Pharaohs of the Sixteenth Dynasty of Egypt